The 1984 Speedway World Pairs Championship was the fifteenth FIM Speedway World Pairs Championship. The final took place in Lonigo, Italy. The championship was won by England (27 points). Silver medal was won by Denmark who beat New Zealand after Run-Off (both 25 points).

Preliminary round
  Neustadt
 May 13

Semifinal 1
  Fjelsted
 June 3

Semifinal 2
  Pardubice
 June 3

World final
  Lonigo, Pista Speedway
 June 17

See also
 1984 Individual Speedway World Championship
 1984 Speedway World Team Cup
 motorcycle speedway
 1984 in sports

References

1984
World Pairs
Speedway World Pairs